Sujata Koirala is a Nepalese actress, known for the Nepali movie Manjari and the online sitcom P.S. Zindagi.

Career
Sujata made her debut as Manjari in the romantic movie Manjari and received positive reviews. Sujata won the award for the Best Debut Actor (Female) at the National Film Awards (Nepal) 2014 for her performance.

She then starred in the online sitcom P.S. Zindagi in the role of Kokab Akhtar appearing opposite Kavita Srinivasan who plays the role of her sister Juna Akhtar.

In 2020, Sujata starred in the short drama The Migrants directed by Parbat Chapagai based on an immigrant couple's fight against real and surreal forces in USA. It screened at First Run Film Festival.

Filmography

Awards

References

External links

Year of birth missing (living people)
Living people
Nepalese film actresses
Actresses in Nepali cinema
Nepalese web series actresses
21st-century Nepalese actresses